Christian David Hanson (born March 10, 1986) is a former American professional ice hockey player. He last played in the St. Louis Blues organization in the NHL. Hanson played college hockey for the University of Notre Dame. He was not selected in the NHL Entry Draft, but signed a contract as a free agent with the Toronto Maple Leafs after his senior season.

Playing career
He attended high school at Peters Township High School, where he was a member of their Pennsylvania State AA Hockey Championship teams. He played Midget "AAA" hockey for the Pittsburgh Hornets, where he was a teammate of Los Angeles Kings prospect Patrick Mullen.

Hanson was signed to a two-year, $1.575-million contract with the Toronto Maple Leafs on March 31, 2009, which included an annual $87,500 signing bonus.

Hanson made his NHL debut on April 3, 2009 against the Philadelphia Flyers. Four nights later, Hanson scored his first career NHL goal against Martin Brodeur in a 4–1 win over the New Jersey Devils. This goal tied his father's career goal mark as well. On April 10, 2010, Hanson recorded his first short-handed goal and his first multi-goal game versus Montreal.

Hanson was selected to join the Team USA roster for the 2010 World Hockey Championship.

Hanson played for Planet USA in the 2010 AHL All-Star Game in Portland, Maine.

On 10 July 2011, the Washington Capitals signed Hanson as an unrestricted free agent, and he was assigned to play in the AHL with the Hershey Bears for the 2011–12 AHL season.

On July 9, 2012, Hanson signed a one-year, two-way contract with the Boston Bruins. The contract paid Hanson $600,000 if he played in the NHL and $105,000 while playing with the Bruins' AHL affiliate, the Providence Bruins. Hanson spent the entire duration of the 2012–13 season with Providence and contributed 29 points in 67 games.

On August 20, 2013, Hanson agreed to a one-year, two-way contract with the St. Louis Blues. He played with the Blues' AHL affiliate, the Chicago Wolves, for the 2013–2014 season.

In a 2017 article for The Players' Tribune, Hanson said that he had retired from professional ice hockey and is working at Sutton Special Risk, a Toronto-based insurance company for which he is Assistant Vice President, Sports.

Family
His father is Dave Hanson, who also played professional hockey and starred as one of the Hanson Brothers in the movie Slap Shot.

Career statistics

Regular season and playoffs

International

Awards and honors

References

External links 

 

1986 births
Living people
American men's ice hockey centers
Chicago Wolves players
Hershey Bears players
Ice hockey players from New York (state)
Ice hockey players from Pennsylvania
Notre Dame Fighting Irish men's ice hockey players
People from Washington County, Pennsylvania
Providence Bruins players
Sportspeople from Glens Falls, New York
Stavanger Oilers players
Toronto Maple Leafs players
Toronto Marlies players
Tri-City Storm players
Undrafted National Hockey League players